The 1916 Boston Red Sox season was the 16th season in the franchise's Major League Baseball history. The Red Sox finished first in the American League (AL) with a record of 91 wins and 63 losses. The team then faced the National League (NL) champion Brooklyn Robins in the 1916 World Series, which the Red Sox won in five games to capture the franchise's second consecutive and fourth overall World Series.

Ballparks
While the Red Sox' home field was Fenway Park, their final two regular season games—a doubleheader against the Philadelphia Athletics—and their three home games of the World Series were played at Braves Field, due to its larger seating capacity.

Between the end of the regular season and the start of the World Series, Boston and Philadelphia played an exhibition game in Worcester, Massachusetts, on October 5. The game was played to raise money for a grave monument for former National League umpire John Gaffney, who had grown up in Worcester and died in 1913.

Regular season

Season standings

Record vs. opponents

Opening Day lineup

Notable transactions
 April 9, 1916: Tris Speaker was traded by the Red Sox to the Cleveland Indians for Sad Sam Jones, Fred Thomas, and $55,000.

Roster

Player stats

Batting

Starters by position
Note: Pos = Position; G = Games played; AB = At bats; H = Hits; Avg. = Batting average; HR = Home runs; RBI = Runs batted in

Other batters
Note: G = Games played; AB = At bats; H = Hits; Avg. = Batting average; HR = Home runs; RBI = Runs batted in

Pitching

Starting pitchers
Note: G = Games pitched; IP = Innings pitched; W = Wins; L = Losses; ERA = Earned run average; SO = Strikeouts

Other pitchers
Note: G = Games pitched; IP = Innings pitched; W = Wins; L = Losses; ERA = Earned run average; SO = Strikeouts

Relief pitchers
Note: G = Games pitched; W = Wins; L = Losses; SV = Saves; ERA = Earned run average; SO = Strikeouts

1916 World Series 

AL Boston Red Sox (4) vs. NL Brooklyn Robins (1)

References

External links
1916 Boston Red Sox team page at Baseball Reference
1916 Boston Red Sox season at baseball-almanac.com

Boston Red Sox seasons
Boston Red Sox
Boston Red Sox
1910s in Boston
American League champion seasons
World Series champion seasons